Amorphoscelis pellucida is a species of praying mantis native to Australia, Indonesia (Java), and Singapore.

See also
List of mantis genera and species

References

Amorphoscelis
Mantodea of Oceania
Mantodea of Asia
Insects described in 1889